Gjert Wilhelmsen (12 February 1927 – 28 February 2018) was a Norwegian shipowner.

He was born in Oslo to shipowner Anders Wilhelmsen and Aslaug Gjertsen, and was a brother of Arne Wilhelmsen. He was educated at the Norwegian Institute of Technology, and was technical director and eventually co-owner of the family company Anders Wilhelmsen AS. Wilhelmsen has held central positions in Det norske veritas, the Norwegian Society for Sea Rescue, the Norwegian Shipowners' Association, and the Norwegian Maritime Museum. He was decorated Commander of the Order of St. Olav in 2005.

References

1927 births
2018 deaths
Businesspeople from Oslo in shipping
Norwegian Institute of Technology alumni
20th-century Norwegian engineers
20th-century Norwegian businesspeople
21st-century Norwegian businesspeople
Order of Saint Olav